"Back for Good" is a song by British band Take That from their third studio album, Nobody Else (1995). It was written by lead singer Gary Barlow, who also co-produced it with Chris Porter. The song topped the UK Singles Chart whilst also charting at number one in 31 countries, as well as reaching the top 10 in many others (including the United States, making it their only hit in that country). At the 1996 Brit Awards, "Back for Good" won the Brit Award for British Single of the Year. In 2003, Q Magazine ranked the song at number 910 in their list of the "1001 Best Songs Ever" and in a UK poll in 2012, it was voted number 11 on the ITV special The Nation's Favourite Number One Single.

Background
Written by Gary Barlow, who also sang lead vocals and engineered by Phil Coxon (keyboard player with OMD), it was Take That's sixth chart topper in the United Kingdom and only top ten hit in the United States. Barlow claims he wrote the song in fifteen minutes. It was unveiled at the 1995 BRIT Awards, and such was the demand that its release date was brought forward. The song made available to the media an unprecedented six weeks before release.

The song appeared on most releases in a slightly remixed form, which added extra instrumentation including additional drum beats. Some releases featured both radio and album versions.

Just prior to this single release, the group had done a photo shoot for Vogue Italia with designer Gianni Versace. The clothing range given to the band by Versace is featured on the single cover.

Release and chart performance
The song was released on 27 March 1995 and entered the UK Singles Chart at number one, selling nearly 350,000 copies in its first week. This made it one of the fastest selling singles of the year, selling almost as many as the rest of the Top 10 that week added together.

It remained at number one in the United Kingdom for four weeks. The song has received a double Platinum sales status certification in the United Kingdom, and is also still regularly ranked high in United Kingdom based favourite ever songs polls. It is their biggest selling single and the biggest selling boyband single ever in the United Kingdom, with sales of 1.2 million as of September 2017. The song won British Single of the Year at the 1996 Brit Awards.

"Back for Good" would later reach number seven on the United States Billboard Hot 100, spending a total of thirty weeks on the chart, sixty six weeks on the US Adult Contemporary chart and 30 weeks on the Top 40 US Airplay chart.

Critical reception
Steve Baltin from Cash Box stated that here, the British pop quartet "has a massive hit on its hands with this very straight-ahead blue-eyed soul ballad." He described it as a "nice, soothing track", adding that "Back for Good" "won’t revolutionize music, but it shows a young band very good at what it does." Chuck Campbell from Knoxville News Sentinel felt that the song "which features a fine melody line and background vocals that decorate the song with perfect finesse, is a great pop confection, not a source of shame." He also named it by far the "best song" of the album. In his weekly UK chart commentary, James Masterton wrote that it's "one of the most breathtakingly brilliant pop singles that had been heard in a long long time." He added that it's "arguably the band's masterpiece and whilst they may have further smash hits after this it is unlikely they will ever measure up to the scale of this one." "If it touches people, it's a good song," remarked Noel Gallagher in an interview with Mojo. "You know, people go on about Take That – but 'Back for Good' said something to me. And if it touches me…"' 

Pan-European magazine Music & Media commented, "With a romantic "film ballad" like this, Take That trespasses Wet Wet Wet's territory, which opens the possibility to crossover to an older audience–the female 25+ demo?–for the first time." A reviewer from Music Week gave the song five out of five and named it Single of the Week, writing, "Take That play it safe opting for a nice-not naughty MOR pop number which will pick up sales outside their usual fanbase. With more than a month of radio support behind it, an instant, and long lasting, number one seems certain." The magazine later added, "Expect to hear this beautifully-arranged, classic pop ballad on the radio and jukeboxes for many years to come." Gerald Martinez from New Sunday Times felt it's "indeed a beautifully produced love ballad."

In 2015, Idolator called the song a "pop masterpiece". In 2018, the song was ranked eleventh by Billboard critics in their compilation of the "100 Greatest Boyband Songs of All Time". And in 2020, Rolling Stone ranked the song number 15 in their list of "75 Greatest Boy Band Songs of All Time".

Music video
The accompanying music video to the song was shot in black and white on 27 February 1995 and directed by Vaughan Arnell and Anthea Benton. It shows the band walking and dancing in the rain as well as the band performing the song in a shelter. Most of the external footage was shot at the backlot of Pinewood Studios. It was also the last music video to feature Robbie Williams in the present day until he rejoined the band in 2010. A 1958 Chevrolet Impala and a 1951 Mercury Custom, both customised in the styles of the 1950s/early 1960s feature in the video. Due to spending so long in cold and wet conditions, several of the band became ill afterwards with flu.

The video has often been an influence in the band performing the song live as they often make use of artificial rain when performing it. It also appears on the DVD release, Never Forget: The Ultimate Collection and was published on Take That's official YouTube channel in October 2009. The video has amassed more than 73 million views as of September 2021.

The music video was also paid homage to by The Wanted in the music video to "Walks Like Rihanna". The video was based on three classic boy band singles and their videos, with "Back for Good" being one of them. New Kids on the Block also paid homage to both Take That and this music video in their video to single, Boys in the Band (Boy Band Anthem).

Usage in media and cover versions
The song was a big hit in Brazil during 1995 and 1996, thanks to soap opera Explode Coração: the song was one of the main songs on the television show's soundtrack.

In an effort to mock his boy band roots, group member turned solo artist Robbie Williams performed a 'hard rock' live version in the style of the Sex Pistols, which was a B-side to his single "Angels" (1998). Williams performed this arrangement of the song with Mark Owen, as the encore at his record-breaking Knebworth Park concerts and eventually performed this version with Take That, upon receiving his Brit Icon Award in 2016.

The song was featured on the final episode of the second series of Spaced, in which Tim, Brian, and Mike, along with Mike's Territorial Army buddies, attempt to play the song for Marsha, a la the boombox scene from Say Anything... It also featured in the final episode of Ricky Gervais and Stephen Merchant's The Office as a love theme for characters Tim (Martin Freeman) and Dawn (Lucy Davis). Gary Barlow stated on ITV1's An Audience with Take That Live broadcast on 2 December 2006 that there were 89 versions recorded by other artists.

The song was covered in a hip hop/dancehall style by Born Jamericans on their 1997 album, Yardcore.

"Back for Good" was covered by Boyz II Men for their Love album, by The Wedding Present for their How the West Was Won album, by McAlmont & Butler in 2002 for the "NME in Association with War Child Presents 1 Love" charity album, and by The Concretes on the Guilt by Association Vol. 1 compilation. Coldplay performed the song with Gary Barlow at Shepherd's Bush Empire, London in aid of War Child in 2009. Barlow also performed the song with JLS at the O2 Apollo Manchester date of his 2012 concert tour.

Track listings

 UK 7-inch vinyl (74321 27146 7)
 "Back for Good" (Radio Mix) – 3:59
 "Sure" (Live) – 3:16
 "Back for Good" (TV Mix) – 4:03

 UK cassette single (74321 27148 2)
 "Back for Good" (Radio Mix) – 3:59
 "Sure" (Live) – 3:16
 "Back for Good" (TV Mix) – 4:03

 UK CD single 1 (74321 27146 2)
 "Back for Good" (Radio Mix) – 3:59
 "Sure" (Live) – 3:16
 "Beatles Tribute" (Live at Wembley Arena) – 11:40

 UK CD single 2 (74321 27147 2)
 "Back for Good" (Radio Mix) – 3:59
 "Pray" (Radio Edit) – 3:43
 "Why Can't I Wake Up with You" (Radio Edit) – 3:37
 "A Million Love Songs" (7" Edit) – 3:53

 European CD single 1 (74321 27963 2)
 "Back for Good" (Radio Mix) – 3:59
 "Sure" (Live) – 3:16

 European CD single 2 (74321 27964 2)
 "Back for Good" (Radio Mix) – 3:59
 "Sure" (Live) – 3:16
 "Beatles Tribute" (Live at Wembley Arena) – 11:40

 Japanese CD single (BVCP-9852)
 "Back for Good" (Radio Mix) – 3:59
 "Sure" (Live) – 3:16
 "Pray" (Radio Edit) – 3:43
 "Why Can't I Wake Up with You" (Radio Edit) – 3:37
 "A Million Love Songs" (7" Edit) – 3:53

 US CD single 1 (07822-12880-5)
 "Back for Good" – 4:03
 "Love Ain't Here Anymore" – 3:57
 "Back for Good" (Live From MTV's Most Wanted) – 4:10

 US CD single 2 (07822-12880-2)
 "Back for Good" – 4:03
 "Love Ain't Here Anymore" – 3:57
 "Back for Good" (Radio Mix) – 3:59
 "Back for Good" (Urban Mix) – 4:02
 "Back for Good" (Live from MTV's Most Wanted) – 4:10

 US cassette single (07822-12880-7)
 "Back for Good" – 4:03
 "Love Ain't Here Anymore" – 3:57

 US 7-inch vinyl (07822-12880-5)
 "Back for Good" – 4:03
 "Love Ain't Here Anymore" – 3:57

 US 12-inch vinyl – Jukebox release only (TAKEBFG1)
 "Back for Good" – 4:03
 "Back for Good" (Radio Mix) – 3:59
 "Back for Good" (Radio Instrumental) – 3:59
 "Back for Good" (Urban Mix) – 4:02
 "Back for Good" (Urban Instrumental) – 4:02

Personnel
Gary Barlow – lead vocals
Howard Donald – backing vocals
Jason Orange – backing vocals
Mark Owen – backing vocals
Robbie Williams – backing vocals

Charts

Weekly charts

Year-end charts

Decade-end charts

Certifications and sales

References

1995 singles
Brit Award for British Single
Number-one singles in Australia
RPM Top Singles number-one singles
European Hot 100 Singles number-one singles
Number-one singles in Germany
Irish Singles Chart number-one singles
Number-one singles in Israel
Number-one singles in Norway
Number-one singles in Scotland
Number-one singles in Spain
UK Singles Chart number-one singles
Take That songs
1990s ballads
Pop ballads
Songs written by Gary Barlow
Torch songs
Black-and-white music videos
Music videos directed by Vaughan Arnell